This is a list of the National Register of Historic Places listings in Childress County, Texas.

This is intended to be a complete list of properties and districts listed on the National Register of Historic Places in Childress County, Texas. There is one district listed on the National Register in the county. The district contains Recorded Texas Historic Landmarks.

Current listings

The locations of National Register properties and districts may be seen in a mapping service provided.

|}

See also

National Register of Historic Places listings in Texas
Recorded Texas Historic Landmarks in Childress County

References

External links

Childress County, Texas
Childress County
Buildings and structures in Childress County, Texas